Ramsey is a suburb 22 miles (35 km) north-northwest of downtown Minneapolis in Anoka County, Minnesota, United States. The population was 23,668 at the 2010 census. It is a northwest suburb of the Twin Cities.

U.S. Highways 10 / 169 (co-signed) and State Highway 47 are two of the main routes, and a station on the Northstar Commuter Rail line to downtown Minneapolis is located in Ramsey.

History
The city of Ramsey originated as a result of trading on the banks of the Mississippi River. Ramsey is named as such because its first settlers arrived on a boat called "Governor Ramsey" named after the first territorial Governor of Minnesota, Alexander Ramsey.

Geography
Ramsey borders the cities of Andover, Anoka, Nowthen, Oak Grove, Dayton, and Elk River.

Demographics

2010 census
As of the census of 2010, there were 23,668 people, 8,033 households, and 6,484 families living in the city. The racial makeup of the city was 91.8% White, 2.8% African American, 0.4% Native American, 2.4% Asian, 0.8% from other races, and 1.7% from two or more races. Hispanic or Latino of any race were 2.4% of the population.

There were 8,033 households, of which 43.9% had children under the age of 18 living with them, 67.6% were married couples living together, 8.5% had a female householder with no husband present, 4.6% had a male householder with no wife present, and 19.3% were non-families. 13.7% of all households were made up of individuals, and 3% had someone living alone who was 65 years of age or older. The average household size was 2.95 and the average family size was 3.24.

The median age in the city was 34.9 years. 28.7% of residents were under the age of 18; 7.8% were between the ages of 18 and 24; 29.4% were from 25 to 44; 27.4% were from 45 to 64; and 6.7% were 65 years of age or older. The gender makeup of the city was 50.3% male and 49.7% female.

2000 census
As of the census of 2000, there were 18,510 people, 5,906 households, and 5,102 families living in the city. The racial makeup of the city was 96.80% White, 0.31% African American, 0.45% Native American, 0.01% Asian, 0.01% Pacific Islander, 0.28% from other races, and 1.15% from two or more races. Hispanic or Latino of any race were 1.19% of the population.

There were 5,906 households, out of which 49.6% had children under the age of 18 living with them, 76.8% were married couples living together, 6.1% had a female householder with no husband present, and 13.6% were non-families. 8.8% of all households were made up of individuals, and 1.4% had someone living alone who was 65 years of age or older.  The average household size was 3.13 and the average family size was 3.33.

In the city, the population was spread out, with 32.1% under the age of 18, 7.1% from 18 to 24, 35.5% from 25 to 44, 22.6% from 45 to 64, and 2.8% who were 65 years of age or older.  The median age was 32 years. For every 100 females, there were 106.1 males.  For every 100 females age 18 and over, there were 106.9 males.

The median income for a household in the city was $68,988, and the median income for a family was $70,926. Males had a median income of $43,898 versus $31,212 for females. The per capita income for the city was $26,057.  About 1.3% of families and 1.6% of the population were below the poverty line, including 2.1% of those under age 18 and none of those age 65 or over.

Government
The current mayor of Ramsey is Mark Kuzma.

References

External links
 
 Ramsey - City Website

Minnesota populated places on the Mississippi River
Cities in Anoka County, Minnesota
Cities in Minnesota